Jiahuihu station is a subway station on Line 17 of the Beijing Subway.  It is named after the planned Jiahui Lake Wetland Park. The station opened on 31 December 2021.

Platform Layout
The station has an underground island platform.

Exits
There are 3 exits, lettered A, C and D. Exit D is accessible via  an elevator.

References

External links

Beijing Subway stations in Tongzhou District
Railway stations in China opened in 2021